Paranormal Movie is a 2013 American parody comedy horror film directed by Kevin Farley. The film is a spoof of the Paranormal Activity series.

Premise
A man, long haunted by the paranormal, captures on camera the horror and hilarity he and his beautiful girlfriend encounter after moving into a new home.

Cast
 Kevin Farley as Larry Fillmore
 Carly Craig as Katie MacDonald
 Nicky Whelan as Cindy
 Eric Roberts as Dr. Lipschitz
 William Katt as Himself
 Tom Sizemore as Himself
 Maria Menounos as Dr. Luni
 John P. Farley as Jack Goff
 Deep Roy as Demon
 Kevin Sorbo as Security Guard
 Quinton Aaron as Himself

References

External links

 

American parody films
2013 comedy horror films
American supernatural horror films
2013 films
American comedy horror films
2013 direct-to-video films
Parodies of horror
Demons in film
2010s parody films
2010s English-language films
2010s American films